Kazemabad (also Romanized as Kāz̧emābād) is a village in Shahrabad Rural District, Shahrabad District, Bardaskan County, Razavi Khorasan Province, Iran. At the 2006 census, its population was 1,020, in 263 families.

References 

Populated places in Bardaskan County